The vice presidents of the State Affairs Commission of the Democratic People's Republic of Korea, previously titled as vice chairmen of the State Affairs Commission, are members of the State Affairs Commission under the President of the State Affairs of North Korea and above the commission's members.

The Constitution of North Korea states that the State Affairs Commission includes a first vice president (Korean: 제1부위원장) and vice presidents. The vice presidents are nominated by the president of the State Affairs and elected by the Supreme People's Assembly for a term that coincides with the assembly's term. The vice presidents of the State Affairs Commission may carry out tasks authorized by the president of the State Affairs.

The post was first created under the title of vice chairman of the National Defence Commission through the 1972 North Korean constitution. The position of first vice chairman of the National Defence Commission was created in 1992 and abolished in 2012. With the abolition of the National Defence Commission and its replacement with the State Affairs Commission in 2016, the current position was created under its initial title as vice chairman of the State Affairs Commission. The position of first vice chairman of the State Affairs Commission was unofficially created on 11 April 2019 and was made official through a constitutional amendment on 29 August of the same year. As the position of chairman of the State Affairs Commission began to be referred to as president of the State Affairs in February 2021, the positions of first vice chairman and vice chairman began to be referred to as first vice president and vice president respectively.

The incumbent first vice president of the State Affairs Commission is Choe Ryong-hae, who was elected on 11 April 2019 after serving as vice president since 29 June 2016. The incumbent vice president of the State Affairs Commission is Kim Tok-hun, who was elected on 29 September 2021.

List of office holders

First Vice President

Vice President

References 

Politics of North Korea
Government of North Korea
State Affairs Commission